Þórður Þórðarson (26 November 1930 – 30 November 2002) was an Icelandic footballer who played as a forward. He made his debut for the Iceland national football team on 29 June 1951 in the 4–3 win against Sweden and went on to earn 18 caps over a period of seven years, during which time he scored 11 goals for his country. Þórður spent his entire playing career with ÍA, spending nine seasons with the club from 1951 to 1960.

International goals

References

1930 births
2002 deaths
Thordur Thordarson
Association football forwards
Thordur Thordarson
Thordur Thordarson